An A-frame house or other A-frame building is an architectural house or building style featuring steeply-angled sides (roofline) that usually begin at or near the foundation line, and meet at the top in the shape of the letter A. An A-frame ceiling can be open to the top rafters.

Although the triangle shape of the A-frame has been present throughout history, it surged in popularity around the world from roughly the mid-1950s through the 1970s. It was during the post–World War II era that the A-frame acquired its most defining characteristics.

Style
A-frame buildings are an ancient form known, in Europe (e.g. cruck frame construction or grubenhaus), China, and the South Pacific islands. Sometimes called a roof hut, these were simple structures used for utilitarian purposes until the 1950s. In 1934, R.M. Schindler built the first modern A-frame house, for owner Gisela Bennati, in Lake Arrowhead, California.  Architects Walter Reemelin, John Campbell, George Rockrise, Henrik H Bull, and Andrew Geller helped to popularize Schindler's idea in the early 1950s, designing A-frame vacation homes. In 1955, Andrew Geller built an A-frame house on the beach in Long Island, New York, known as the Elizabeth Reese House. Geller's design won international attention when it was featured in The New York Times on May 5, 1957. Before long, thousands of A-frame homes were being built around the world.

The Abbey Resort in Fontana-on-Geneva Lake, Wisconsin claims to have the world's tallest wooden A-frame.

Rise in popularity
The post–World War II popularity of the A-frame has been attributed to a combination of factors including Americans' extra disposable income, the inexpensiveness of building an A-frame structure, and a new interest in acquiring a second home for vacationing.

Another factor contributing to the rise of the A-frame included the adaptability of the structure itself, which enabled architects to experiment with more modern designs. A-frames were a useful medium in which architects could explore their creative side since they were relatively cheap to build.

Additionally, many people preferred the idea of a "modern-style" vacation home to that of a "modern-style" primary home. A-frames became available as prefabricated kits, lowering the cost even more, and were sold by Macy's department stores.

After the rise of the archetypal A-frame, architects soon began experimenting with new designs, which led to what became known as the modified A-frame style.

Example

Residential examples 
Bennati House (1934), Lake Arrowhead, California, designed by Rudolph Schindler
Elizabeth Reese House, Sagoponack, New York, designed by Andrew Geller
Numerous examples in Washington state.
Numerous examples, including historic kits and (recent?) "Yosemite-adjacent" ones, in Curbed
12 A-frame houses in Northcrest Historic District, Atlanta, Georgia
Ranger cabin, Oregon, in Zig-zag Ranger District
Park City, Utah ski houses (two being demolished, but do others survive?)

Religious examples 
A-frame buildings which had been made popular since 1955 by Andrew Geller were built for churches across the world. The modern shape was reinterpreted spiritually as representing "hands at prayer" since 1961 and the design of the Holy Cross Anglican Church in Tokyo by the Czech-born American architect Antonin Raymond. His use of interlaced pillars was inspired by the traditional Japanese traditional country minka houses known as gasshō-zukuri (合掌造り), literally "clasped-hands style".

The first A-shape church seems to be the Simpson Methodist Church in 1957 in Pullman, Washington. The style was in 1960 adopted by the Catholic Church to build Saint Joseph Church, Lynden, Washington just before the Our Lady of Fatima Roman Catholic Church in 1961. It was used most impressively for the United States Air Force Academy Cadet Chapel inaugurated in 1962. 

At the same time, the A-frame used was in Europe as early 1959 for Bakkehaugen Church in Norway by architect Ove Bang who was an advocate of functionalism. When the Arctic Cathedral in 1965, the A-frame church had become a new identity of religious architecture in Scandinavia. It spread to Europe and was used in 1967 to build the Yaddlethorpe Methodist Church in Yaddlethorpe.

The A-shape religious building made it across the Pacific Ocean to New Zealand with the Whiteley Memorial Methodist Church dedicated on 19 October 1963 considered as "Taranaki's most beautiful building".

Christian religious buildings have also adopted the A-style architecture mainly in South East Asia. The first example after Japan might be the Luce Memorial Chapel in Taiwan in 1963, followed by Saint Michael's Church in Sihanoukville in 1965, Xavier Hall Catholic Church in Bangkok in 1972, or the Church of the Pastoral Center in Da Lat in 2010 are some examples of a similar architectural style. 

This style is still popular in Europe also, as in Henry's Ecumenical Art Chapel in Finland in 2005.

Commercial examples 

Numerous older Wienerschnitzel stores are A-frames 
Whataburger stores
IHOP restaurants
 Tastee-Freez stores
Nickerson Farms stores (e.g., see :File:Abandoned Nickerson Farms, Picacho, AZ.jpg)
Travelers Rest Motel, near Everett, Pennsylvania
Dick Lewis Pontiac-Cadillac (1964), Olympia, Washington
 The main building of Florida's Disney's Contemporary Resort, in which the Walt Disney World monorail has a station
Lake Easton Resort (c.1963), Easton, Washington
Tiki Lodge (c.1964), Spokane, Washington

Educational examples 

 Wakefield Country Day School, Flint Hill, Virginia.

See also
 Minka
 Vernacular architecture

References

Bibliography

External links

 A-frame Style from Picture Dictionary of House Styles in North America and Beyond on About.com, by Jackie Craven
 A-frame Home - An A-frame home in the Hollywood Hills owned and restored by Nicky Panicci
 A-frame House Website (archive) about an a-frame house located in Phoenix, AZ.

 
Vernacular architecture